Adored (also known as Little More Than a Year Ago, Adored: Diary of a Male Porn Star and Adored: Diary of a Porn Star) is a 2003 Italian drama film written, directed and starred by Marco Filiberti.

It was screened in the Panorama section at the 2003 Berlin Film Festival.

Plot 
Life events of Riccardo Soldani aka Riki, a gay pornstar in the nineties, through the eyes of his brother.

Cast 
: Riccardo Soldani
Urbano Barberini: Federico Soldani
Rosalinda Celentano: Luna
Francesca D'Aloja: Charlotte
Erika Blanc: Angela
Luigi Diberti: Rod Lariani
Caterina Guzzanti: Koka 
: Julie 
: Silvio Valle 
Giuliana Calandra: Franca Soldani
: Gigi Ralli

See also
 List of Italian films of 2003

References

External links

Italian drama films
2003 drama films
2003 films
2003 directorial debut films
Films about gay male pornography
Films about pornography
Films set in the 1990s
Italian LGBT-related films
2003 LGBT-related films
LGBT-related drama films
2000s Italian films